The M-42 was a 45-mm Soviet light semi-automatic anti-tank gun. Its full official name is 45-mm anti-tank gun model 1942 (M-42) (Russian: 45-мм противотанковая пушка образца 1942 года (М-42)). These guns were used from 1942 until the end of World War II.

History

The M-42 was developed by the No. 172 Plant in Motovilikha as an upgrade of the 45 mm anti-tank gun M1937 (53-K). The gun received a longer barrel (20 calibers more than the previous one, so it was a 45 mm/L66), shells with more powerful cartridges, and a thicker shield (7 mm instead of 4.5 mm), but of hinged construction as a need for reduced profile, requiring crews to kneel while serving the weapon. Some minor changes were also introduced in order to speed up production.

These guns were used from 1942 until the end of World War II. In 1943, due to its insufficient anti-armor capabilities against new German tanks such as the Tiger, Panther and Panzer IV Ausf H, the M-42 was partially replaced in mass production by the more powerful 57 mm ZiS-2 anti-tank gun. The M-42 remained in production however, as it was quite effective against lighter vehicles and could pierce the side armour of the Panther and Panzer IV Ausf H. Fragmentation shells and canister shot gave the gun some anti-personnel capability.

Mass production of the M-42 ceased in mid-1945. The total number of guns produced is 10,843.

Ammunition
Ammunition types:
Armor-piercing
Fragmentation
Canister
Smoke
Projectile weight:
AP: 1.43 kg (3.15 lbs)
APCR: 0.85 kg (1.87 lbs)
Fragmentation: 2.14 kg (4.71 lbs)

Performance

Notes

References
 Shunkov V. N. - The Weapons of the Red Army, Mn. Harvest, 1999 (Шунков В. Н. - Оружие Красной Армии. — Мн.: Харвест, 1999.)

External links

45 mm anti-tank gun model 1942 ar rustrana.ru 

World War II anti-tank guns
World War II artillery of the Soviet Union
Anti-tank guns of the Soviet Union
45 mm artillery
Motovilikha Plants products
Weapons and ammunition introduced in 1942